Hari sa Hari, Lahi sa Lahi is a 1987 Filipino-Chinese epic historical drama film directed by Eddie Romero, Hsiao Lang, and Lili Chou, and starring Vic Vargas and Wang Hsing Gang. Set in the early 15th century, the film is about the meeting between the East King of Sulu, Paduka Pahala, and the Emperor of the Ming Dynasty, Zhu Di.

Cast
Vic Vargas as Paduka Pahala
Wang Hsing Gang as Zhu Di
Dan Alvaro
Rosemarie Sonora as Gemuning
Tanya Gomez
Isabel Rivas
Liu Chun as 
Chang Jie as Zheng He
Alan Bautista
Ruben Rustia
Chou Jie as Lu Lan

Release
Hari sa Hari, Lahi sa Lahi was given a "G" rating by the Movie and Television Review and Classification Board (MTRCB). The film had its world premiere at the Tanghalang Gerardo de Leon of the Manila Film Center on August 14, 1987, and received its wide release in the Philippines on August 21.

References

External links

1987 films
1980s historical drama films
1987 drama films
Chinese historical drama films
Cultural depictions of Chinese monarchs
Cultural depictions of Chinese men
Cultural depictions of Filipino men
Cultural depictions of Zheng He
Filipino-language films
Films directed by Eddie Romero
Films set in the 1410s
Films set in the Ming dynasty
Philippine historical drama films
1980s Tagalog-language films
1980s English-language films